A Bigger Bang is the 22nd British and 24th American studio album by the English rock band the Rolling Stones, released through Virgin Records on 6 September 2005. It is their most recent studio album of original compositions to date, though a follow-up has been long promised. It is also their last album of original material recorded with Charlie Watts on drums before his death in 2021. 

Unlike their prior effort eight years before, the sprawling and eclectic Bridges to Babylon, which had a bewildering array of producers, musical styles, and guest musicians, the Stones set out to make a basic, hard rock album that hearkened back to their 1960–70s heyday. A single producer, Don Was, was brought in to co-produce the album alongside the band's principal songwriting and production team of vocalist Mick Jagger and Keith Richards. Joining the two were band members Ronnie Wood on guitar and Charlie Watts on drums, contract players Darryl Jones on bass and Chuck Leavell on keyboards, and multi-instrumentalist Matt Clifford.  Most of the basic tracks were recorded as a simple trio of Jagger, Richards, and Watts, with overdubs added later by other players.

The back-to-basics method of recording the album paid off for the Stones, who saw the album reach number three in the US, number two in the UK, and number one in eleven countries around the world. The lead single, "Streets of Love", failed to chart in the US, but was otherwise successful around the world, reaching number 15 in the UK and top-40 in over a dozen other countries. Two other singles were released to moderate worldwide sales.  Reviews of the album were generally favourable; while critics noted that the album was not up to the standards of the Stones classic period, it nonetheless was among the best reviewed of their later albums. The follow-up tour, which lasted two years, would become the highest-grossing tour of all time by its completion.  A Martin Scorsese-directed concert film titled Shine a Light documented the tour.

History
The album used a stripped-down style reminiscent of Some Girls (1978), but with a harder, more contemporary edge. Although initial reports stated that the Stones had "returned to their roots" with the record, the minimal instrumentation, rough mix, tough blues and "garage" rock hybrid bear certain similarities to the style of contemporary artists like the White Stripes and the Black Keys.

Many songs were recorded with just the core band of Jagger, Richards and Watts. Ronnie Wood was absent from many sessions, playing on only ten of the sixteen tracks, with only occasional contributions from outside musicians comprising the recording of the album. This is also the first album where Jagger plays bass guitar on some tracks.

The Stones said in a statement that the album's title reflects "their fascination with the scientific theory about the origin of the universe."

Writing and recording 
Songs for A Bigger Bang were composed by Jagger and Richards in June 2004 at Jagger's chateau in Pocé-sur-Cisse, France. At the château, they learned of Charlie Watts' throat cancer diagnosis and debated about postponing the writing, but ultimately went ahead after determining that Watts was not required to be present until later. As a result of this, Jagger played the drums during early guide track recordings; all but one of these was later rerecorded by Watts, but Jagger's beat remained. Jagger and Richards shared bass and guitar parts between them. The album was produced by Don Was and the sound engineering was done by Krish Sharma. Mixing for the album was performed by Jack Joseph Puig and Dave Sardy.

Release and reception

The first single, "Streets of Love"/"Rough Justice", reached No. 15 in the UK singles chart, while A Bigger Bang peaked at No. 2 on the UK charts. Another song, "Sweet Neo Con", was critical of the conservative Christian movement in American politics.

In August 2005, the Rolling Stones embarked on the 90-show A Bigger Bang Tour in support of the album. It was met with sold-out tickets at every destination, usually within minutes of going on sale. The tour was extended into 2007 because Richards got hurt falling out of a tree in Fiji and required surgery in New Zealand. The tour concluded in August 2007 at the O2 Arena in London.

Critical reaction was mostly positive. The aggregate score of the album by Metacritic was rated 73 out of 100, categorizing the reviews as "generally favourable". A Bigger Bang was touted as the best Rolling Stones album in years. Nevertheless, all of the Stones albums since 1989's Steel Wheels had been similarly lauded, and many critics and fans felt that the Stones had yet to record a late-period album truly up to their high standards. It was chosen as one of Amazon.com's Top 100 Editor's Picks of 2005, and ranked the second-best album of the year by Rolling Stone magazine, behind rapper Kanye West's Late Registration. A review by the Associated Press referred to the album as "a winner" that "hammers home the fact that The Rolling Stones still have 'it'".

A Bigger Bang went platinum in the US and Germany, and gold in Japan. According to Nielsen SoundScan it sold 546,000 copies in the US, and as of 31 March 2006, 2.4 million copies worldwide according to EMI.

In 2009, A Bigger Bang was reissued by Universal Music Group. The US re-release was handled by Interscope Records, while Polydor Records handled all other territories.

Usage in other media 
Songs from A Bigger Bang have seen commercial use in television, including multiple appearances in Days of Our Lives.

The 12th Track "Laugh, I Nearly Died", was used in the Season One episode of Supernatural "Bloody Mary" at the end of the episode where Sam sees a vision of his dead girlfriend Jessica at the side of the street.

Track listing

Personnel
Credits adapted from album liner notes.

The Rolling Stones

Mick Jagger – vocals , guitars , keyboard , vibraphone , bass guitar , harmonica , percussion , slide guitar , production 
Keith Richards – guitars , backing vocals , lead vocals , bass guitar , piano , keyboard , production 
Charlie Watts – drums 
Ronnie Wood – slide guitar , guitars

Additional musicians
Darryl Jones – bass guitar 
Chuck Leavell – piano , organ 
Matt Clifford – keyboard , vibraphone , organ , piano , programming , string arrangement , production 
Blondie Chaplin – vocals 
Lenny Castro – percussion

Production

Don Was – production 
Ryan Castle – engineer 
Andy Brohard – assistant engineer 
Dave Sardy – mixing 
Krish Sharma – engineer , mixing 
Jack Joseph Puig – mixing 
Dean Nelson – assistant engineer 
J.D. Andrew – additional engineer and editing 
German Villacorta – 2nd assistant engineer 
Pierre de Beauport – guitar technician, demo engineer
Stephen Marcussen – mastering
Stewart Whitmore – digital editor for Marcussen Mastering
Tony King – artwork coordination
Nick Knight – photography
Michael Nash Associates – design and art direction

Charts

Weekly charts

Year-end charts

Certifications

References

External links

2005 albums
2005 video albums
Albums produced by Don Was
Albums produced by the Glimmer Twins
Music video compilation albums
The Rolling Stones albums
The Rolling Stones video albums
Virgin Records albums